The Severnoe Design Bureau (Severnoe Proyektno-Konstruktorsoye Byuro), founded in 1946, is a Russian ship designing company. It is based in Saint Petersburg with an office in Moscow. Formerly, the bureau was known as the Northern Project Design Bureau (NPDB).

It is not to be confused with Severnaya Verf or Nevskoe Design Bureau, abbreviated as NDB. Those firms are also based in Saint Petersburg but have no relation whatsoever to the Severnoe DB.

The Severnoe Design Bureau is one of the leading designers of surface ships, mainly corvettes, frigates, cruisers, and destroyers. Over its 70-year-history, it has produced designs of some of the most powerful and advanced warships for the Soviet and Russian Navy, as well for foreign navies. It also produces civil designs, most notably LNG carriers.

Some notable designs
Kirov-class battlecruiser
Slava-class cruiser
Sovremennyy-class destroyer
Talwar-class frigate
Admiral Grigorovich-class frigate
Admiral Gorshkov-class frigate
Rubin-class patrol boat

External links
Website of the Bureau

Shipbuilding companies of the Soviet Union
United Shipbuilding Corporation
Companies based in Saint Petersburg